Chaetanaphothrips orchidii is a species of thrips. It is a pest of finger millet and sorghum in India.

References

Thripidae
Insect pests of millets